Holderness was a parliamentary constituency centred on the Holderness area of the East Riding of Yorkshire.  It returned one Member of Parliament (MP) to the House of Commons of the Parliament of the United Kingdom.

The constituency was created for the 1885 general election, and abolished for the 1950 general election.

Boundaries
1885–1918:

1918–1950: The Municipal Boroughs of Beverley and Hedon, the Urban Districts of Cottingham, Hornsea, and Withernsea, the Rural Districts of Patrington and Skirlaugh, part of the Rural District of Beverley, and in the Rural District of Sculcoates the civil parishes of Preston and Sutton.

Members of Parliament

Elections

Elections in the 1880s

Elections in the 1890s

Elections in the 1900s

Elections in the 1910s 

General Election 1914–15:

Another General Election was required to take place before the end of 1915. The political parties had been making preparations for an election to take place and by the July 1914, the following candidates had been selected; 
Unionist: Arthur Stanley Wilson
Liberal: Fred Maddison

Election in the 1920s

Election in the 1930s

Election in the 1940s

References

Parliamentary constituencies in Yorkshire and the Humber (historic)
Constituencies of the Parliament of the United Kingdom established in 1885
Constituencies of the Parliament of the United Kingdom disestablished in 1950
Beverley